Valery Potorocha (born 16 April 1996) is a Belarusian footballer who plays for Slavia Mozyr.

References

External links

1996 births
Living people
Belarusian footballers
Belarusian expatriate footballers
Association football midfielders
Expatriate footballers in Slovakia
Belarusian expatriate sportspeople in Slovakia
Belarusian Premier League players
Belarusian First League players
2. Liga (Slovakia) players
FC Dinamo Minsk players
FC Khimik Svetlogorsk players
Partizán Bardejov players
FC Smolevichi players
FC Sputnik Rechitsa players
FC Dynamo Brest players
FC Slavia Mozyr players